Langrolay-sur-Rance (literally Langrolay on Rance) is a commune in the Côtes-d'Armor department of Brittany in northwestern France.

Population

Inhabitants of Langrolay-sur-Rance are called langrolaisiens in French.

See also
Communes of the Côtes-d'Armor department

References

External links

Official website 

Communes of Côtes-d'Armor